The Dromkeen Medal is a literary prize awarded annually by the Courtney Oldmeadow Children's Literature Foundation for those who have advanced children's literature in Australia. The Medal was established by bookseller, Joyce Oldmeadow in 1982, and is named after the property, Dromkeen Homestead, near Riddell's Creek, Victoria which the Oldmeadow family purchased in 1973, and established as a children's literature museum.

The State Library of Victoria has presented the Dromkeen Medal since 2013.

List of medal winners

1980s 
1982 Lu Rees AM MBE
1983 Maurice Saxby AM
1984 Patricia Wrightson OBE
1985 Anne Bower Ingram OAM
1986 Albert Ullin OAM
1987 Joan Phipson AM
1988 Patricia Scott AM
1989 Robert Ingpen AM

1990s 
1990 Mem Fox AM
1991 Robin Klein
1992 Julie Vivas
1993 Alf Mappin
1994 Agnes Nieuwenhuizen
1995 Jennifer Rowe AC
1996 Belle Alderman AM
1997 Colin Thiele AC
1998 Graeme Base
1999 Barbara Ker Wilson AM

2000s 
2000 Paul Jennings AM
2001 Julie Watts
2002 Ann James
2003 Ivan Southall AM
2004 Margaret Dawn Hamilton AM
2005 Roland Harvey
2006 Walter McVitty AM
2007 Patricia Edgar AM
2008 Ruth Park AM
2009 Bronwyn Bancroft

2010s 
2010 Shaun Tan
2011 Libby Gleeson AM
2012 Patricia Mullins
2014 Helen Chamberlin
2015 Andy Griffiths
2016 Alison Lester AM
2017 Erica Wagner
2018 John Marsden

2020s

Dromkeen Librarian's Award
In 1994 an annual award was created to recognise someone working in an Australian library setting "in recognition of the important role they play in introducing young people to literature and encouraging an enjoyment and love of reading."

1990s 
 1994 Suzette Boyd
 1995 Debra Rosenfeldt
 1996 Bronwen Bennett
 1997 Jill McCallum
 1998 Juliana Bayfield
 1999 Miranda Harrowell

2000s 
 2000 Suzanne Thwaites
 2001 Rita Fellows
 2002 Jenny Stubbs
 2003 Barbara Braxton
 2004 Margaret Catterrall
 2005 Margy Heuschele
 2006 Jennifer Grant
 2007 Jennifer Katauskas
 2008 Ruth Jones
 2009 Pam Macintyre

2010s 
 2010 Suzy Wilson
 2011 Heather Heraud
 2012 Libby Ahern
 2014 Pam Saunders
 2015 Rosario Martinez
 2016 Sarah Steed
 2017 Megan Daley, Junior School Teacher Librarian at St Aidan's Anglican Girls' School, Corinda, Queensland
2018 Sue Wootton, Children's Support Officer at Eastern Regional Libraries (ERL)

2020s

See also

List of Australian children's literary awards

References

External links
Dromkeen Medal at Scholastic Australia to 2011 [archived] 

1982 establishments in Australia
Australian children's literary awards
Awards established in 1982